The 1934 Lambeth North by-election was held on 23 October 1934.  The by-election was held due to the death of the incumbent Liberal MP, Frank Briant.  It was won by the Labour candidate George Strauss who had previously been the MP for Lambeth North but lost it to Briant (who had also previously been an MP for the seat) in the landslide defeat for Labour in 1931.

Electoral history

Result

References

Lambeth North by-election
Lambeth North,1934
Lambeth North by-election
Lambeth North,1934
Lambeth North by-election